Anthony or Antony Williams may refer to:

Government
Anthony Williams (diplomat) (1923–1990), former British Ambassador to Cambodia, Libya and Argentina
Anthony Williams (Medal of Honor) (1822–?), American Civil War sailor and Medal of Honor recipient
Anthony Williams, candidate in the United States House of Representatives elections in Illinois, 2010
Anthony A. Williams (born 1951), mayor of Washington D.C., 1999–2007
Anthony D. Williams (politician) (1799–1860), Liberian politician
Anthony H. Williams (born 1957), Pennsylvania State Senator

Others
Anthony Williams (bishop) (1892–1975), Anglican bishop in the Caribbean
Anthony Williams (comics), Welsh artist
Anthony Williams (footballer) (born 1977), Welsh former goalkeeper
Anthony Williams (musician) (1931–2021), Trinidadian music pioneer and inventor of the steel pans
Anthony Williams or Roc Raida (1972–2009), American turntablist and hip hop deejay
Anthony Williams, American fashion designer and winner of season 6 of Project Runway All Stars
Antony Williams (technologist), English physicist, Microsoft software architect, designer of OLE and COM; see Component Object Model
Anthony D. Williams (author) (born 1974), co-author of Wikinomics
Antony John Williams (born 1960), Welsh chemist, president of ChemSpider

See also
Antoni Williams or Toni Williams (1939–2016), New Zealand singer
Tony Williams (disambiguation)